Luis Fernández (1594 – 1654), a Spanish historical painter, both in oil and in fresco, born at Madrid in 1594, was a pupil of Eugenio Caxes. There are by him in the cross-walk of the convent of La Merced Calzada scenes from the life of St. Ramon, painted in 1625, and in Santa Cruz were several frescoes and oil paintings, which perished, however, by fire in the 17th century. His works, executed in the style of his master, are distinguished for correctness of design and beauty of colouring. He died at Madrid in 1654.

References

 
Antonio Palomino, An account of the lives and works of the most eminent Spanish painters, sculptors and architects, 1724, first English translation, 1739, p. 37

1594 births
1654 deaths
17th-century Spanish painters
Spanish male painters
Artists from Madrid